Robert Carroll (born 15 February 1968) is an English retired professional footballer who played as a right winger in the Football League for Brentford. He later embarked on a long career in non-League football, making 140 appearances for Yeovil Town.

Playing career

Early years 

A winger, Carroll began his career in the youth system at Southampton, but failed to make a first team appearance. He dropped into non-League football to sign for Southern League Premier Division club Gosport Borough in 1986.

Brentford 
Carroll made a move into League football to return home to London and join Third Division club Brentford on non-contract terms in September 1986. He made 26 appearances and scored five goals during the 1986–87 season and signed a permanent contract. Carroll was out of favour during the 1987–88 season, though he managed to score five goals in 16 appearances up front. He rejected a monthly contract and departed at the end of the campaign, having made 42 appearances and scored 10 goals during less than two years at Griffin Park.

Return to non-League football 
After his release from Brentford, Carroll dropped back into non-League football, joining Southern League Premier Division club Fareham Town, for whom he made 50 appearances and scored 12 goals. He made the move up to the Conference to join Yeovil Town in 1989 and scored 43 goals in 140 appearances during a three-year spell at Huish Park. He moved to Conference rivals Woking in 1992 and failed to make an impression before further spells in the Isthmian and Southern Leagues with Crawley Town, Salisbury City, Basingstoke Town, Worthing and Bashley.

Coaching career 
As of 2015, Carroll was first team coach at Wessex League Premier Division club Christchurch. As of 2018, he was working as Football Development Officer at Fareham Town. In April 2020, Carroll was appointed as manager of the Romsey Town Development Squad.

Career statistics

Honours 
Basingstoke Town

 Hampshire Senior Cup: 1996–97

References

1968 births
English footballers
Brentford F.C. players
English Football League players
Association football wingers
Southampton F.C. players
Gosport Borough F.C. players
Fareham Town F.C. players
Yeovil Town F.C. players
Woking F.C. players
Crawley Town F.C. players
Salisbury City F.C. players
Basingstoke Town F.C. players
Worthing F.C. players
Bashley F.C. players
Association football forwards
People from Greenford
Footballers from the London Borough of Ealing
National League (English football) players
Isthmian League players
Southern Football League players
Living people